Helsinki City Hall is a central administrative building of Helsinki, Finland. City Hall is located in the Kruununhaka district, overlooking Market Square, at address Pohjoisesplanadi 11–13. City Hall is the seat of the City Council of Helsinki.

History
Completed in 1833, the building originally served as Hotel Seurahuone and was an important cultural facility hosting many premieres. The hotel was designed by Carl Ludvig Engel who also designed the major buildings around the nearby Senate Square. The city purchased the building in 1901 and, after the hotel moved out in 1913, renovated it as a city hall.

Following an architectural competition the City Hall was radically remodeled by architect Aarno Ruusuvuori in 1965–70, replacing many of the old classical interiors and building modern glass-facaded insertions.

Functions
The City Hall hosts the offices of the Mayor of Helsinki and the Deputy Mayors as well as the meeting facilities for the City Council and City Board. The City Council meets on alternate Wednesdays in the Council Chamber.

City Hall hosts the Virka information service, which is open to all Helsinki residents. The Virka gallery hosts exhibitions, concerts, and movie screenings.

See also
 Kuopio City Hall
 Oulu City Hall
 Seinäjoki City Hall
 Turku City Hall

References

External links
 City Hall’s 50th anniversary website

City and town halls in Finland
Buildings and structures in Helsinki
Carl Ludvig Engel buildings
Government buildings completed in 1833
Kruununhaka
Aarno Ruusuvuori buildings